Yavi is a rural municipality and village in Jujuy Province in Argentina. Nearby is the site of the Battle of Yavi (1816) in Argentina's war of independence.

References

External links

Populated places in Jujuy Province